Nagaraj, Nagraj or Nagaraja or Nagarajan is a male Indian given name and Indian surname. It originates in the   'king of the nāgas'. It is especially prevalent in southern India and northeastern parts of India.

People 
D. R. Nagaraj (1954–1998), Indian cultural critic and political commentator
Dingri Nagaraj
Erode Nagaraj (born 1970), Mridangam player, lecturer in The Music Academy, Chennai
Indu Nagaraj, Indian playback singer
Manoranjitham Nagaraj, Indian politician and incumbent member of the Tamil Nadu Legislative Assembly
Milana Nagaraj (born 1989), Indian film actress
Nagaraj Gobbargumpi
R Umadevi Nagaraj (born 1965)
Ramakrishnan Nagaraj (born 1953), Indian biochemist and molecular biologist
Shringar Nagaraj (1939–2013), Kannada actor, cameraman, and producer of India's first silent movie
V. Nagaraj (born 1962), Malaysian director, producer, distributor and consultant
Vatal Nagaraj, politician from Karnataka

Nagaraja
Nagaraja Rao (1914–2004), deceased Indian cricketer and umpire
Nagaraja Rao Havaldar (born 1959), Indian classical vocalist
V. Nagaraja (born 1954), professor
Mamta Patel Nagaraja, American engineer

Nagraj 
Munishree Nagraj, an Indian writer and poet
Nagraj Manjule (born 1977), Indian filmmaker and screenwriter
Roopa Nagraj (born 1983), Emirati cricketer

Characters 
Nagraj is a fictional superhero appearing in Raj Comics.
 Nagaraj, protagonist of R.K. NArayan's 1991 novel The World of Nagaraj
 Nagaraja Cholan, protagonist of the 2013 Indian Tamil film Nagaraja Cholan MA, MLA

See also
Nagarajan (disambiguation)
Nagaraj (disambiguation)
Nagaraja

Indian masculine given names
Indian surnames